is a Japanese former paralympic athlete and cyclist.

Sporting career
At the age of 21, Motohashi was diagnosed as having atrophy of the optic nerve.

He has subsequently competed at three paralympics in two different sports. He first competed in the 1992 Summer Paralympics, where he ran in the marathon, finishing in 6th place, and won a bronze medal in the high jump. In the 1996 Summer Paralympics, Motohashi competed in the marathon only. In the 2000 Summer Paralympics, he moved over to cycling, but failed to win any medals despite competing in four different events.

Teaching career
From 2003, he became a psychotherapy instructor, teaching techniques such as acupuncture and massage.

Arrest for assault
In the early hours of 15 April 2008, Motohashi was arrested for assault after punching a restaurant worker in the face in Yamagata while under the influence of alcohol.

References

External links
 

Paralympic athletes of Japan
Paralympic cyclists of Japan
Athletes (track and field) at the 1992 Summer Paralympics
Athletes (track and field) at the 1996 Summer Paralympics
Cyclists at the 2000 Summer Paralympics
Paralympic bronze medalists for Japan
Living people
Medalists at the 1992 Summer Paralympics
Year of birth missing (living people)
Paralympic medalists in athletics (track and field)
Japanese male high jumpers
Japanese male marathon runners
Visually impaired high jumpers
Visually impaired marathon runners
Paralympic high jumpers
Paralympic marathon runners